Birgit Klomp (born 27 April 1940) is a retired German freestyle swimmer who won a bronze medal at the 1954 European Aquatics Championships. She competed at the 1956 Summer Olympics in the 100 m and 4×100 m freestyle events and finished fourth in the relay. She won three national titles in the 100 m (1955, 1956) and 400 m freestyle (1955).

Her husband, Friedrich Osselmann (b. 1934), is a retired German water polo player who competed in the 1956 and 1960 Olympics. Their son, Rainer Osselmann, competed in water polo at the 1984 and 1988 Olympics.

References

1940 births
Living people
Sportspeople from Düsseldorf
German female swimmers
Swimmers at the 1956 Summer Olympics
German female freestyle swimmers
Olympic swimmers of the United Team of Germany
European Aquatics Championships medalists in swimming
21st-century German women
20th-century German women